The Phantom of the Operetta (Spanish:El Fantasma de la opereta) is a 1955 Argentine musical comedy film directed by Enrique Carreras and starring Alfredo Barbieri, Amelia Vargas and Tono Andreu. The film premiered on 24 June 1955. 
The film's sets were designed by the art director Óscar Lagomarsino.

Cast
 Alfredo Barbieri 
 Amelia Vargas 
 Tono Andreu 
 Gogó Andreu 
 Inés Fernández
 Mario Baroffio
 Alfonso Pisano 
 Manuel Alcón 
 Lalo Hartich

Plot
The Phantom turns out to be a violent serial killer that tortures and murders the chorus girls.

Reception
El Mundo opined that the film was a: "Luck of a pirouette supported by the obligatory convention of the case." La Nación wrote:: "Evocations of the famous Frankenstein, Dracula and the Wolf Man, dominators of serious films, appear in this comedy of scares and jokes with music, animation and very lively rhythms."

References

External links
 

1955 films
1955 musical comedy films
Argentine musical comedy films
1950s Spanish-language films
Argentine black-and-white films
Films directed by Enrique Carreras
1950s Argentine films